Wasama is a Finnish surname. Notable people with the surname include:

 Jarmo Wasama (1943–1966), Finnish ice hockey player
 Matti Wasama (1918–1970), Finnish ice hockey player

Finnish-language surnames